Robert Douglas Brown (born September 24, 1984) is an American professional basketball player who last played for the NBA G League Ignite of the NBA G League.

After graduating from Cal State Fullerton, Brown entered the 2007 NBA draft, but went undrafted. In his first pro season, he played overseas with the German League team Alba Berlin, and in 2008, he returned to the United States, where he played for several NBA teams, including the Sacramento Kings, Minnesota Timberwolves, New Orleans Hornets, and the Los Angeles Clippers.

While playing for Montepaschi Siena in the 2012–14 season, Brown tied a EuroLeague scoring record since the 2000–01 season, with 41 points (the all-time EuroLeague single-game scoring record is 99 points, held by Radivoj Korać). Brown won the EuroLeague's Alphonso Ford EuroLeague Top Scorer Trophy in 2013.

High school
Brown attended Westchester High School, in Los Angeles, California, where he played high school basketball. He played alongside future NBA players Trevor Ariza and Hassan Adams.

College career
After high school, he went on to play NCAA Division I college basketball at California State University, Fullerton, where he played with the Cal State Fullerton Titans, from 2003 to 2007. Brown was selected to the All-Big West Conference First Team, of the 2005–06 season. In his 4 years with the Titans, he scored 1,961 points, in 116 games (16.9 points per game), making him the school's all-time leader in total points scored, at the time.

Professional career

Early years
Brown left Cal State Fullerton in 2007, but ultimately went undrafted in the 2007 NBA draft. He signed with the German team ALBA Berlin in August 2007, whom he helped win the German national domestic league. He was also a participant in a five-overtime European second-tier level EuroCup game, in which he top-scored with 44 points, the second-highest total ever in the competition.

First NBA stint
In 2008, Brown returned to the U.S., and played for the New Orleans Hornets in the NBA Summer League, with his highlight being a game-winning shot against the Charlotte Bobcats, in a 77–75 win. He was rewarded for his stellar summer league play, by his being offered a two-year contract with the Sacramento Kings, one of a handful of NBA teams that courted him. He was also pursued by multiple overseas teams that had offered him lucrative deals, among them the Israeli league's Maccabi Tel Aviv. He also came close to accepting a multi-year contract, "in the millions", from the Spanish league's FC Barcelona.

On February 19, 2009, Brown was traded to the Minnesota Timberwolves, along with Shelden Williams, in exchange for Rashad McCants and Calvin Booth. On September 9, he was traded to the New Orleans Hornets, along with Darius Songaila, in exchange for Antonio Daniels, and a 2014 second round pick. On January 26, 2010, Brown was again traded to the Los Angeles Clippers, for a conditional 2014 2nd round pick and cash considerations.

In July 2010, Brown joined the Toronto Raptors for the 2010 NBA Summer League.

Return to Europe
On September 22, 2010, Brown signed with the Polish League team Asseco Prokom, but he was released in December, due to poor performances in the EuroLeague. In his first EuroLeague season, he averaged 10.7 points in 26 minutes per game, over six games, with Asseco Prokom, but shot only .333 percent from the field. On December 3, 2010, he signed a two-month contract with the Greek League club Aris, in order to replace Pierre Pierce, who was sidelined for two months with an injury. In 35 games, he averaged 12.2 points, 2.3 rebounds, 3.0 assists and 0.8 steals in 28.7 minutes.

On August 5, 2011, Brown signed with the German League team EWE Baskets Oldenburg.

Montepaschi Siena
On August 8, 2012, Brown signed a one-year contract with the Italian League team Montepaschi Siena. He replaced 2011–12 Alphonso Ford top scoring trophy winner Bo McCalebb, who joined Fenerbahçe Ülker a week before. He won the EuroLeague 2012–13 Alphonso Ford EuroLeague Top Scorer Trophy, averaging 18.8 points per game. He was also fourth in the EuroLeague in assists, with an average of 5.3 per game, and led the league in several other parameters.

On January 4, 2013, Brown scored 41 points in a 98–92 comeback win over Fenerbahçe Ülker. He tied the EuroLeague's single-game scoring record since the 2000–01 season. He was eventually named the EuroLeague MVP of the Month for January. In April 2013, Brown won the EuroLeague Alphonso Ford Trophy, the annual award given to the EuroLeague's "Best Scorer" of the season. He averaged 18.8 points, 5.3 assists, and 1.7 rebounds per game, over a total of 24 games during the 2012–13 season, while shooting .411 from the field. He scored in double figures in 22 games, reached the 20-point mark on 10 occasions, and got to 30 points twice.

Dongguan Leopards
In the summer of 2013, Brown signed with the Dongguan Leopards of China. On December 27, 2013, he scored 74 points in a 137–135 overtime victory over the Sichuan Blue Whales. Brown had scored the second-highest number of points in a single-game in the Chinese Basketball Association (CBA)'s history, being just one point shy from breaking the record of 75 points scored, that was held by Quincy Douby, and which has since been eclipsed by Errick McCollum's 82 point effort, on January 30, 2015.

On May 22, 2014, Brown extended his contract with Dongguan, for three more years.

Beşiktaş Sompo Japan
On March 28, 2016, Brown signed with Beşiktaş Sompo Japan of Turkey, for the rest of the Turkish Super League's 2015–16 season.

Return to the NBA
On September 23, 2016, Brown signed with the Houston Rockets. On December 5, 2016, he was waived by the Rockets after appearing in six games. He re-signed with the Rockets on December 16.

On September 25, 2017, Brown re-signed with the Rockets. On January 5, 2018, he was waived by the Rockets.

Olympiacos Piraeus
On February 22, 2018, Brown signed with Olympiacos of Greece, for the rest of the Greek Basket League and EuroLeague seasons.

Mornar
On November 1, 2018, Brown signed a one-year contract with Mornar of the ABA League and the EuroCup. On November 28, Brown parted ways with Mornar.

NBA G League Ignite
On February 1, 2021, Brown signed with the NBA G League Ignite.

The Basketball Tournament
Brown played for the CitiTeam Blazers in the 2018 edition of The Basketball Tournament (TBT), a single-elimination winner-take-all tournament for a $2 million prize. In two games, he averaged a team-high 20.5 points per game, 3.5 rebounds per game and 3.0 assists per game. CitiTeam Blazers lost in the second to Team Challenge ALS. In TBT 2019, Brown played for four-time defending champion Overseas Elite, who advanced to the semifinals where they suffered their first-ever defeat, losing to Carmen's Crew, 71–66.

National team career
Brown represented the United States national team at the 2015 Pan American Games, where he won a bronze medal.

Career statistics

NBA

Regular season

|-
| align="left" | 
| align="left" | Sacramento
| 47 || 1 || 14.4 || .381 || .330 || .765 || .8 || 1.9 || .3 || .0 || 5.2
|-
| align="left" | 
| align="left" | Minnesota
| 21 || 1 || 12.2 || .416 || .389 || .889 || .8 || 1.4 || .3 || .1 || 5.5
|-
| align="left" | 
| align="left" | New Orleans
| 22 || 0 || 14.9 || .395 || .258 || 1.000 || .8 || 2.1 || .4 || .0 || 6.6
|-
| align="left" | 
| align="left" | L.A. Clippers
| 23 || 0 || 8.3 || .329 || .281 || .714 || .9 || 1.8 || .3 || .0 || 3.0
|-
| align="left" | 
| align="left" | Houston
| 25 || 0 || 4.9 || .383 || .400 || 1.000 || .2 || .6 || .0 || .0 || 2.5
|-
| align="left" | 
| align="left" | Houston
| 20 || 0 || 5.8 || .328 || .275 || .500 || .4 || .6 || .2 || .0 || 2.5
|- class="sortbottom"
| align="center" colspan="2"| Career
| 158 || 2 || 10.7 || .379 || .317 || .806 || .7 || 1.5 || .3 || .0 || 4.4

Playoffs

|-
| align="left" | 2017
| align="left" | Houston
| 5 || 0 || 4.4 || .500 || .455 || .000 || .4 || .2 || .0 || .0 || 5.0
|- class="sortbottom"
| align="center" colspan="2"| Career
| 5 || 0 || 4.4 || .500 || .455 || .000 || .4 || .2 || .0 || .0 || 5.0

EuroLeague

|-
| align="left" | 2009–10
| align="left" | Asseco Prokom
| 6 || 5 || 26.1 || .333 || .250 || .875 || 1.0 || 1.8 || .8 || .2 || 10.7 || 4.3
|-
| align="left" | 2012–13
| align="left" | Montepaschi
| 24 || 24 || style="background:#CFECEC;"| 32.6 || .411 || .344 || .890 || 1.7 || 5.3 || .5 || .1 || style="background:#cfecec;"| 18.8 || style="background:#cfecec;"| 17.4
|-
| style="text-align:left;"| 2017–18
| style="text-align:left;"| Olympiacos
| 9 || 0 || 10.8 || .194 || .100 || .545 || .6 || 1.1 || .1 || .0 || 2.2 || -.3
|- class="sortbottom"
| align="center" colspan="2"| Career
| 39 || 29 || 26.6 || .383 || .309 || .865 || 1.3 || 3.8 || .4 || .1 || 13.7 || 11.3

Personal life
Brown shares the same name with the famous American R&B singer. In an interview, he affirmed jokes about his name: "Someone is always trying to be funny...asking me where Whitney's at." Upon announcing his signing with the Kings, ESPN ran the headlines "Their prerogative: Kings agree with Bobby Brown", and "New addition: Sources say Kings agree to deal with Brown", in reference to the singer's 1988 anthem "My Prerogative", and his former boy band New Edition, respectively.

References

External links
NBA G League profile

 
 California State-Fullerton College Profile
 Bobby Brown at euroleague.net
 Bobby Brown at baskethotel.com 
 Bobby Brown at esake.gr 
 Bobby Brown at legabasket.it 

1984 births
Living people
ABA League players
African-American basketball players
Alba Berlin players
American expatriate basketball people in China
American expatriate basketball people in Germany
American expatriate basketball people in Greece
American expatriate basketball people in Italy
American expatriate basketball people in Poland
American expatriate basketball people in Turkey
American expatriate basketball people in Montenegro
American men's basketball players
Aris B.C. players
Asseco Gdynia players
Basketball players at the 2015 Pan American Games
Basketball players from Los Angeles
Beşiktaş men's basketball players
Cal State Fullerton Titans men's basketball players
EWE Baskets Oldenburg players
Houston Rockets players
KK Mornar Bar players
Los Angeles Clippers players
Medalists at the 2015 Pan American Games
Mens Sana Basket players
Minnesota Timberwolves players
NBA G League Ignite players
New Orleans Hornets players
Olympiacos B.C. players
Pan American Games bronze medalists for the United States
Pan American Games medalists in basketball
P.A.O.K. BC players
Point guards
Sacramento Kings players
Shanxi Loongs players
Shenzhen Leopards players
Undrafted National Basketball Association players
United States men's national basketball team players
Westchester High School (Los Angeles) alumni
21st-century African-American sportspeople
20th-century African-American people
Big3 players
American men's 3x3 basketball players